Stephen Ole Marai (born 11 November 1962) is a Kenyan male former middle-distance runner. He was a finalist in the 800 metres at the 1987 World Championships in Athletics and finished sixth despite Tom McKean catching his foot on the last lap. His personal best time of 1.44.42 minutes was achieved in 1990 and ranked him sixth in the world that year. He also competed at the 1987 All-Africa Games in his native Kenya, where he was a silver medallist behind his compatriot and world champion Billy Konchellah.

International competitions

See also
List of African Games medalists in athletics (men)

References

External links



Living people
1962 births
Kenyan male middle-distance runners
World Athletics Championships athletes for Kenya
African Games medalists in athletics (track and field)
African Games silver medalists for Kenya
Athletes (track and field) at the 1987 All-Africa Games
20th-century Kenyan people